Marriott Henry Brosius (March 7, 1843 – March 16, 1901) was a Republican member of the U.S. House of Representatives from Pennsylvania.

Education and military service

Marriott Brosius was born in Colerain Township, Lancaster County, Pennsylvania, where he attended Thomas Baker's Academy. During the American Civil War, he enlisted as a private in Company K, Ninety-seventh Regiment, Pennsylvania Volunteers, in October 1861, for three years, and reenlisted May 1864. He was honorably discharged in December 1864.  On February 28, 1865, was commissioned a second lieutenant for bravery on the field of battle. After the war he attended the State Normal School at Millersville, Pennsylvania, and the law department of the University of Michigan at Ann Arbor. He was admitted to the bar in 1868 and commenced practice in Lancaster, Pennsylvania.

House of Representatives
Brosius was elected as a Republican to the 51st and to the six succeeding Congresses. He was chairman of the United States House Committee on Reform in the Civil Service during the 54th and 55th Congresses, and of the United States House Committee on Banking and Currency during the 56th Congress. He served until his death in Lancaster in 1901, aged 58. He is buried in Greenwood Cemetery.

See also
List of United States Congress members who died in office (1900–49)

References
Profile, Politicalgraveyard.com; accessed March 7, 2017.
Memorial addresses on the life and character of Marriott Brosius, late a representative from Pennsylvania delivered in the House of Representatives and Senate frontispiece 1902

1843 births
1901 deaths
Union Army officers
Pennsylvania lawyers
Millersville University of Pennsylvania alumni
University of Michigan Law School alumni
People of Pennsylvania in the American Civil War
People from Lancaster County, Pennsylvania
Republican Party members of the United States House of Representatives from Pennsylvania
19th-century American politicians